Is It Just Me? is an American gay-themed film, written and directed by J.C Calciano and released in 2010, in which a socially shunned columnist makes a romantic match online.  In doing so, he accidentally messages under the wrong account that forwards his roommate's photo, rather than his own, creating an identity mix-up.

Plot
Is It Just Me? is a gay-themed film written and directed by J.C Calcino.
The story focuses on the life of a young man, Blaine (Nicholas Downs), as he searches for true love. Fortune befalls him when Xander, (David Loren), a soft-spoken Texan musician who he meets online, shows interest in him. However, Blaine soon realizes that this is not the perfect situation that he thought it was when it is revealed that he had accidentally used his more athletic roommate's online account to talk to Xander. Cameron (Adam Huss), his roommate and a go-go dancer, agrees to pose as Blaine on a date with Xander. Their friendship is pushed to its limits by Blaine as he asks many absurd favors from his friend in order to keep up the lie. The effects of a low self-esteem are apparent in Blaine's life as he is unsure of himself, to the extent of meeting dates through online profiles, but is forced to face them in the end.

Cast
 Nicholas Downs as Blaine
 David Loren as Xander
 Adam Huss as Cameron
 Michelle Laurent as Michelle
 Michael Donahue as Antonio
 Bob Rumnock as Bob
 Bruce Gray as Ernie
 Christopher King as Frontier Model
 Keith Roenke as Barista
 Christopher Tisa as Coffee Patron (billed as Chris Tisa)
 Brian Schulze as Cameron's Friend
 Bryce Blais as Drew
 Jed Bernard as Pool Shark
 Brody Kramer as Man in bed
 Michael Hennessy as Bartender #1
 Alisa Berhorst as Bartender #2 (billed as Alisa J. Campbell)
 Jeremiah Dupre as Bartender #3
 Sam Wickham as Jogger
 Gabriel Coble as Neighbor #1
 Derek Soldenski as Neighbor #2
 Beau Nelson as Club Kid
 Paul A. Becker as GoGo Dancer #1
 Michael Elepterakis as GoGo Dancer #2
 Oskar Rodriguez as GoGo Dancer #3
 Brandon David Wright as GoGo Dancer #4 (billed as Brandon Wright)
 Bijoux as Donatella

Production
Is It Just Me? is the first film by writer/director JC Calciano, whose film credits include a 1996 associate producer credit for Impossible. Calciano also served as the former head of production for Tom Cruise's Cruise/Wagner Productions at [Paramount Pictures], as well as running the new media division of Melanie Griffith's One World Networks.

With "Is It Just Me," Calciano intended the story to follow the formula of a 21st-century romantic comedy that would be entertaining to all viewers, regardless of the main character's sexual orientation.  It was also based on the desire to pull from his own 11-plus year committed relationship to his partner, that would highlight some of the lessons learned that he felt were worth sharing, by expressing insights into the connections between that affect each other's lives, while focusing on the positive aspects of gay relationships.

Awards

"Is It Just Me?" was the recipient of the 2010 Rainbow Award, in the Narrative Feature Film category, for the 2010 Honllulu Rainbow Film Festival .

References

External links
 
 

2010 films
LGBT-related comedy films
2010 LGBT-related films
Gay-related films
2010s English-language films